The Chrysler AB platform was a truck platform created in 1971. It was mainly used for full-size vans. AB vehicles have used two wheelbases: 109.3 in and 127.2 in.

Models:
 1971-1980 Dodge Sportsman
 1971-1980 Dodge Tradesman
 1971-1972 Fargo Van (Canada only)
 1974-1983 Plymouth Voyager
 1981-2003 Dodge Ram Van
 1981-2003 Dodge Ram Wagon

AB